Jack Rife (born April 10, 1943) is an American politician in the state of Iowa.

Rife was born in Muscatine, Iowa. He attended Muscatine Community College and Iowa State University and is a farmer. A Republican, he served in the Iowa State Senate from 1983 to 2001 (29th district from 1983 to 1993 and 20th district from 1993 to 2001).

References

1943 births
Living people
People from Muscatine, Iowa
Iowa State University alumni
Farmers from Iowa
Republican Party Iowa state senators